Charles Solomon may refer to:

 Charles Solomon (racketeer) (1884–1933), known as King, American racketeer
 Charles Solomon (politician) (1889–1963), known as Charley, American socialist politician
 Charles J. Solomon (1906–1975), American bridge player